Martina Navratilova was the defending champion and won in the final 7–6, 6–2 against Raffaella Reggi.

Seeds
A champion seed is indicated in bold text while text in italics indicates the round in which that seed was eliminated.

  Martina Navratilova (champion)
  Chris Evert (third round)
  Zina Garrison (third round)
  Helena Suková (third round)
  Natasha Zvereva (first round)
  Lori McNeil (first round)
  Mary Joe Fernández (quarterfinals)
  Claudia Kohde-Kilsch (second round)
  Hana Mandlíková (first round)
  Patty Fendick (first round)
  Catarina Lindqvist (second round)
  Nathalie Tauziat (third round)
  Larisa Savchenko (third round)
  Raffaella Reggi (final)
  Anne Minter (first round)
  Rosalyn Fairbank (semifinals)

Draw

Finals

Top half

Section 1

Section 2

Bottom half

Section 3

Section 4

References
 1989 Pilkington Glass Championships Draw

Singles
Pilkington Glass Championships